Gronya Somerville (born 10 May 1995) is an Australian badminton player specializing in doubles. She has won nine Oceania Championships titles, six in the women's doubles and three in the mixed doubles.

Personal life 
Somerville, born to an Australian mother of Anglo-Celtic origin and a Chinese father, became famous when it was revealed that she is the descendant of a prominent Qing dynasty political reformer, Kang Youwei. She is studying exercise science at Victoria University.

Career 
Somerville's skills were discovered during a badminton talent identification program which she attended after receiving a flyer from her primary school PE teacher when she was about 12 or 13. Born in Melbourne in 1995, Somerville first captured the media's attention as a young player in 2012 at the Uber Cup in central China's Hubei Province.

She won gold medals at the 2014 Oceania Badminton Championships in women's doubles and mixed team events. Her current partners are Setyana Mapasa in women's doubles and Simon Leung in mixed doubles. She represented her country at the 2014 Commonwealth Games in Glasgow, Scotland. Together with Mapasa, they managed to win Australia's first ever Grand Prix title in 2016, after winning the Canada Open. They also won the Dutch Open in the same year. In 2017, she and Mapasa won the women's doubles title at the Oceania Championships, and a silver in the mixed doubles event partnered with Joel Findlay.

She competed at the 2020 Summer Olympics in the women's and mixed doubles but was eliminated in the group stage in both events.

Achievements

Oceania Championships 
Women's doubles

Mixed doubles

BWF World Tour (1 title) 
The BWF World Tour, which was announced on 19 March 2017 and implemented in 2018, is a series of elite badminton tournaments sanctioned by the Badminton World Federation (BWF). The BWF World Tour is divided into levels of World Tour Finals, Super 1000, Super 750, Super 500, Super 300 (part of the HSBC World Tour), and the BWF Tour Super 100.

Women's doubles

BWF Grand Prix (2 titles) 
The BWF Grand Prix had two levels, the Grand Prix and Grand Prix Gold. It was a series of badminton tournaments sanctioned by the Badminton World Federation (BWF) and played between 2007 and 2017.

Women's doubles

  BWF Grand Prix Gold tournament
  BWF Grand Prix tournament

BWF International Challenge/Series (7 titles, 11 runners-up) 
Women's doubles

Mixed doubles

  BWF International Challenge tournament
  BWF International Series tournament
  BWF Future Series tournament

References

External links 

 
 
 

1995 births
Living people
Sportspeople from Melbourne
Australian sportspeople of Chinese descent
People of Cantonese descent
Australian people of Irish descent
Australian female badminton players
Badminton players at the 2020 Summer Olympics
Olympic badminton players of Australia
Badminton players at the 2014 Commonwealth Games
Badminton players at the 2018 Commonwealth Games
Badminton players at the 2022 Commonwealth Games
Commonwealth Games competitors for Australia
20th-century Australian women
21st-century Australian women
People from Carlton, Victoria
Sportswomen from Victoria (Australia)